Lieutenant General Nalin K. B. Angammana (1945 – 1995) was a senior Sri Lanka Army officer, who was the former General Officer Commanding, 3 Division.

Early life and education
Born in Kandy, Angammana was educated at Dharmaraja College, Kandy.

Military career
Joining the Ceylon Army, Angammana as an officer cadet and received his basic officer training at the Army Training Centre, Diyatalawa. Thereafter he was commissioned as a Second Lieutenant in the 1 Field Engineer Regiment, Sri Lanka Engineers. He attended the dthe Defence Services Staff College, Wellington gaining the Psc qualification and served as the commanding officer of the 1 Field Engineer Regiment from March 1987 to September 1988. He was serving as the General Officer Commanding, 3 Division when he was killed on 30 July 1995. He was returning to his headquarters following an inspection of army detachment that had been attacked the LTTE few hours prior. His vehicle hit a pressure mine buried by the LTTE off Valaichenai the resulting explosion killed Major General Angammana and three other officers and wounded 13 other soldiers. He is the most senior officer of Sri Lanka Army to be killed in the field during the Sri Lankan Civil War, he was posthumously promoted to the rank of Lieutenant General and the Lieutenant General N K B Angammana Memorial Hall named in his honor at the regimental headquarters of the Sri Lanka Engineers.

See also
Denzil Kobbekaduwa
Sri Lankan Civil War

References

External links
Ministry of Defence, Sri Lanka
Heroes who made the supreme sacrifice 

1945 births
1995 deaths
Alumni of Dharmaraja College
Sri Lankan lieutenant generals
Sinhalese military personnel
Sri Lankan military engineers
Landmine victims
Sri Lanka Military Academy graduates
Sri Lankan military personnel killed in action
People killed during the Sri Lankan Civil War
Sri Lanka Engineers officers